Langdon Park may refer to:
Langdon, Washington, D.C., an area of Washington, D.C. in the United States
Langdon Park DLR station, a Docklands Light Railway station in Poplar, London, United Kingdom 
Langdon Park School, Poplar, London, or the name of the adjacent local park